Kullmann is a surname. Notable people with the surname include:

Christopher Kullmann (born 1986), German footballer
Olaf Kullmann (1892–1942), Norwegian naval officer and peace activist
Leonie Kullmann (born 1999), German swimmer
Dimitri Kullmann (born 1958), British neurologist

See also
Cullmann, a surname
Kehlmann, a surname
Kuhlman, a surname
Kullman, a surname
Elisabeth Kulmann (1808-25), Russian-German poet